The Flag of the Organization for Security and Co-operation in Europe is a flag used to represent the Organization for Security and Co-operation in Europe, an intergovernmental organisation with member states in Europe, Central Asia and North America.

Design
The flag consists of a white field charged the logo of the organisation, i.e. four blue squares containing the lower-case letters "o", "s", "c" and "e". Variants also exist in the German and Russian languages.

Variants

Gallery

References

Organization for Security and Co-operation in Europe
OSCE